The Twentieth Anniversary Macintosh (or "TAM") is a limited-edition personal computer released in 1997 to mark Apple's 20th birthday. The machine was a technological showcase of the day, boasting a number of features beyond simple computing, and with a price tag aimed at the "executive" market.

History
April 1, 1996, marked 20 years since the day that Steve Jobs, Steve Wozniak, and Ronald Wayne came together to form Apple Computer. As this milestone arrived and came to the attention of Apple's then-current executives, the decision was made to release a limited edition Macintosh computer to celebrate—and so the "Spartacus" (or "Pomona", or "Smoke & Mirrors") project was born.

The normal time-span to develop a new Macintosh computer was 18+ months, although available time was less. However, the design team had already been working on several "dream" concepts, and soon settled on the most feasible of those: the (almost) all-in-one LCD-based design. To reduce development time, many off-the-shelf components were used on the new computer's internals.

The TAM was announced almost 20 years to the day after Jobs and Wozniak incorporated the company, in January 1997 at MacWorld Expo, San Francisco. It was given a release date of March 20, 1997, with a retail price of £5,545 or €6,637. Originally intended as a mainstream product, the marketing group turned it into a pricey special edition. 

Upon its unveiling, the TAM was predicted to cost , which would include a direct-to-door concierge delivery service. Customers who paid full price for the TAM, and then complained to Apple when the price was so drastically cut, were offered a free high-end PowerBook as compensation.

Specifications and design

The TAM featured a 250 MHz PowerPC 603ev processor and 12.1" active matrix LCD powered by an ATI 3D Rage II video chipset with 2 MB of VRAM capable of displaying up to 16-bit color at either 800x600 or 640x480 pixels. It had a vertically mounted 4x SCSI CD-ROM and an Apple floppy SuperDrive, a 2 GB ATA hard drive, a TV/FM tuner, an S-Video input card, and a custom-made Bose sound system including two "Jewel" speakers and a subwoofer built into the externally located power supply "base unit".

A thick "umbilical" cable connects the base unit to the head unit, supplying both power, and communications for the subwoofer. The umbilical connects via a multi-pin connector, which is a possible cause of the TAM's one major fault: the "speaker buzz". Inspections of units that received a repair by Apple due to the speaker buzz found one or more extra resistors had been installed in the umbilical. Ensuring the connectors are free of dust/dirt has also been known to resolve the "buzz", though the buzz ultimately only affected a small percentage of machines. An Apple Engineer noted that the thick umbilical was intended to power a higher end CPU, however that option was ultimately curtailed, though the diameter of the umbilical remained.

The TAM came with a unique 75 key ADB keyboard which featured leather palm-rests and a trackpad instead of a mouse. The trackpad could be detached from the keyboard if desired, with a small leather insert found underneath the keyboard ready to fill the gap. When not required, the keyboard could slide under the TAM's head unit, leaving the trackpad exposed for continued access. The TAM also came with a remote control (standard with the Apple TV/FM Tuner card), but also featured buttons on the front panel that could control sound levels, CD playback, brightness, contrast, and TV mode. The pre-installed operating system was a specialized version of Mac OS 7.6.1, which allowed control over those features. It is the last Macintosh model able to boot and run System 7 natively.

Expandability was offered via a 7-inch PCI slot and Apple Communication slot II for the addition of Ethernet. Later G3 upgrade options offered by Sonnet and NewerTechnologies made use of the TAM's Level II Cache slot, which allow the computer to reach speeds of up to 500 MHz. All of these options come at the price of the TAM's slim profile. The back panel must be removed, and replaced with an (included) "hunchback" cover that adds several inches to the depth of the machine.

The TAM featured a unique startup chime, which is not used on any other Macintosh models.

Production and release
The TAM was only released in the USA, Japan, France, Germany, and the UK.

Both of Apple's founders, Steve Wozniak and Steve Jobs, received a TAM. When "Woz" allowed people to see into his office via webcam in the late 1990s, his TAM was visible on his desk.

Due to the scarcity of scale, rather than training all Apple authorized technicians in repairing the TAM, Apple opted to ship faulty units to three central locations worldwide: one per continent. The US location was the Eastman Kodak Company's service center in Rochester, New York. Apple's Service Source CD, containing information for authorized technicians in the repair of Apple computers, lists the TAM as a "closed unit", to be returned to said repair locations for all repairs. It does not contain a "take apart" guide for the TAM.

Websites

Rather than a simple page on Apple's website, the TAM was given its own website, albeit one of only six brief pages. This was a departure from Apple's standard advertising practice for its other Macintosh computers of the time. The website was shut down by Apple in 1999 and redirected to the main Apple website.

Not long after the TAM's release, a community website was created by Bob Bernardara, a TAM owner in the U.S. He created the site for TAM owners and it featured news and information about the TAM, along with links to useful software and a forum for discussions. Apple had an active link to the site shortly before the last TAM rolled was made.

Welcome to The 20th Anniversary Macintosh Web Site—the "Official" home of the TAM user community. This is the place where 20th Anniversary Macintosh owners can share a wealth of information on this "insanely great" product. The TAM (Twentieth Anniversary Macintosh) is a unique machine in the world of computers and this site will help you get the most out of yours.

The TAM site actively ran for several years and it eventually had to shut down when Bernardara could not contact Axon, the Australian hosting company who hosted the site, to make critical updates.

A number of newer TAM community websites have appeared over the years.

Discontinuation
Steve Jobs returned to Apple in 1997. In March 1998 he made sweeping changes, including scrapping the Newton MessagePad. The timing itself was not conspicuous, most Apple computers only feature a 1-year production run, and the TAMs began in March 1997. However Jobs stated that he hated the TAM. Dealers in the US ran out of stock within 14 days of the final price drop.

Reception
The TAM was criticized for being too pricey compared to other computers. PC World placed the TAM as 25th in their "Worst Tech Products of All Time" feature in 2006, citing it as one of the priciest listed personal computer with played-out specs.

Furthermore, Steve Jobs himself has also stated in 1997 that he hated the TAM.

Legacy
While the Twentieth Anniversary Macintosh may not have been a well-known machine for its time, nor a big seller, it did have a lasting influence on personal computers. Jony Ive refined the original concept of the TAM. He then became director of the Industrial Design Group, in charge of designing later computers. Like the TAM, Apple's modern iMac, starting with the G5 model, uses a vertically mounted removable drive (i.e. SuperDrive) behind the screen. Even the removable trackpad has been replicated with Apple's Magic Trackpad.

External power supplies were also used in later Apple computers such as the Power Mac G4 Cube and Mac Mini. Joint efforts with speaker manufacturers (originally Bose but later Harman Kardon) have become common for several Apple computers.

In popular culture

Due to its unconventional design, the TAM has featured in numerous films and television series, including:

 Seinfeld: Several episodes of the ninth and final season in Jerry's apartment.
 Friends: Behind Chandler's office desk in the fourth season, in the episode "The One With the Worst Best Man Ever".
 The Real World: Seattle: Present on the desk in the Pier 70 office.
 Sabrina (1995): A prototype TAM is on the desk of Linus Larrabee. The TAM prototype sits on the far right side of Linus, on a dedicated side desk. The CD player has a see through port in the middle of the door that allows for the CD to be inserted and removed, this see through feature was removed in the production version that has a solid dark grey plastic door. The actual unit that Linus had on his desk was Apple's in-house development model that Apple lent to the studio.
 Batman & Robin (1997): Used by Alfred to write a CD (a capability the real computer did not have).
 Serial Experiments Lain (1998): The first computer Lain has is a red-colored TAM.
 Children of Men (2006): A TAM is used in Jasper's hideout to show video feeds of intruders breaking in. In this movie it would be 30 years old, as the film is set in 2027.

References

External links
 Apple TAM Tech Spec page
 Enthusiast Website - Forums, Pictures and Videos 404!

Macintosh all-in-ones
Macintosh case designs
PowerPC Macintosh computers
Computer-related introductions in 1997